The Agusan River is third longest river in the Philippines, located in the north-eastern part of Mindanao island, draining majority of the Caraga region and some parts of Davao de Oro.

Geography
The headwaters of the river are found in the mountains of Davao de Oro, near its border with Davao Oriental and east of Tagum. It finally drains into the Butuan Bay at its mouth in Butuan.

The marsh serves a flood retention basin for the Agusan River, cutting the high discharge of water causing flash floods in the lower reaches of the river. Aside from that, the marsh harbors unique and pristine habitats like the sago and peat swamps forest and is a home to endangered and endemic flora and fauna. As a consequence, it was designated a wildlife sanctuary by then-President Fidel V. Ramos in 1996.

Watershed
The Agusan River basin is divided into three sub-basins on the basis of topographic features: the upper Agusan River basin, the middle Agusan River basin, and the lower Agusan River basin. The upper Agusan River basin is the section from its headwaters in the mountains of Davao de Oro to Santa Josefa, Agusan del Sur to Veruela, Agusan del Sur, the middle Agusan River basin is the section of the river from Santa Josefa to Amparo, Agusan del Sur while the lower Agusan River basin is from Amparo to its mouth at Butuan.

See also
 List of rivers of the Philippines

References

External links

Rivers of the Philippines
Landforms of Agusan del Norte
Landforms of Agusan del Sur
Landforms of Davao de Oro
Butuan